Jane Kara Saville (born 5 November 1974) is an Australian race walker who won a bronze medal at the 2004 Summer Olympics in Athens. She was born in Sydney.

Saville, from an athletically inclined family, competed in swimming, surf lifesaving, and walking as a junior athlete. She has competed at four Olympics, with a midfield result in 1996. In the 20 km racewalking event at the 2000 Summer Olympics in her home city of Sydney, when heading into the stadium's tunnel for the final stretch, Saville was disqualified for an illegal gait (lifting, a very common occurrence in race walking; the previous leader of the event had already been disqualified). Saville collapsed in tears. Afterwards, when asked what she needed, she replied: "A gun to shoot myself". Saville recovered her composure soon after and was publicly philosophical about her loss.

On her bronze medal in Athens, Saville stated: "Nothing will make up for a gold medal in your home town, but you know this is where the Olympics began and any medal here, you know, I'm absolutely ecstatic with it".

Saville has won three gold medals at the Commonwealth Games: in the 10-kilometre walk in 1998 and in the 20-kilometre walk in 2002 and 2006. She has won the Australian women's race walking championship five times. She was the Australian flagbearer at the 2006 Commonwealth Games in Melbourne.

She is coached by her husband, professional cyclist Matt White. She splits her time between Sydney and Oliva, Spain. Her sister, Natalie Saville, is also a race walker and finished second to her at the 2006 Commonwealth Games.

Saville announced her retirement from competitive racewalking in February 2009, with her future plans including continued work in community health and fitness promotion and a role on the IAAF racewalking technical committee.

Saville has completed a Bachelor's degree in social sciences from the University of New South Wales.

Both Jane and her sister Natalie Saville live in the City of Randwick Local Government Area. Together with Natalie, Jane was presented with the Keys to the City of Randwick on 22 October 2002 by Mayor Dominic Sullivan in recognition of outstanding achievement in sport.

Personal life
Saville is a supporter of her hometown rugby league club the South Sydney Rabbitohs.

Notes

External links 
 Official website
 
 Video of 2000 Olympic disqualification

1974 births
Living people
Athletes from Sydney
Sportswomen from New South Wales
Australian female racewalkers
Olympic athletes of Australia
Olympic bronze medalists for Australia
Athletes (track and field) at the 1996 Summer Olympics
Athletes (track and field) at the 2000 Summer Olympics
Athletes (track and field) at the 2004 Summer Olympics
Athletes (track and field) at the 2008 Summer Olympics
Medalists at the 2004 Summer Olympics
Commonwealth Games gold medallists for Australia
Commonwealth Games medallists in athletics
Athletes (track and field) at the 1994 Commonwealth Games
Athletes (track and field) at the 1998 Commonwealth Games
Athletes (track and field) at the 2002 Commonwealth Games
Athletes (track and field) at the 2006 Commonwealth Games
University of New South Wales alumni
Australian social scientists
Australian Institute of Sport track and field athletes
Olympic bronze medalists in athletics (track and field)
20th-century Australian women
21st-century Australian women
Medallists at the 1998 Commonwealth Games
Medallists at the 2002 Commonwealth Games
Medallists at the 2006 Commonwealth Games